Securities firms
Securities